John Aloysius Stanton (September 15, 1857 – August 25, 1929) was an American landscape and religious painter. He was a professor and the dean of faculty of the San Francisco Art Institute.

Life
Stanton was born on September 15, 1857, in Grass Valley, California.

Stanton was a landscape and religious painter. He was a professor at the San Francisco Art Institute for 26 years, and he also served as its dean of faculty. He was a member of the Bohemian Club.

With his wife Anita, Stanton had three daughters and two sons. They resided in Palo Alto, California, where he died on August 25, 1929. His work can be seen at the Fine Arts Museums of San Francisco and the Harvard Art Museums.

References

1857 births
1929 deaths
People from Grass Valley, California
People from Palo Alto, California
San Francisco Art Institute faculty
Painters from California
American landscape painters
Religious painters
19th-century American painters
20th-century American painters